Osmán Pérez Freire (Santiago, 1878 - Madrid, 28 April 1930) was a Chilean composer. Born in Santiago, his family moved to Mendoza, in the desert Cuyo region of western Argentina, in 1886. Freire moved to Spain in the 1920s.

Works, editions and recordings
 "Ay-Ay-Ay" song on Ay-Ay-Ay recital Luigi Alva Decca 1963

References

Links 
 

1878 births
1930 deaths
People from Santiago
People from Mendoza, Argentina
Argentine composers
Chilean emigrants to Argentina
Argentine expatriates in Spain